Dionysius Adrianus Petrus Norbertus Koolen (21 January 1871 – 24 March 1945) was a Dutch politician of the defunct Roman Catholic State Party (RKSP), later formed to the Catholic People's Party (KVP) now merged into the Christian Democratic Appeal (CDA).

He was a member of the General League of Roman Catholic Caucuses and its continuation, the Roman Catholic State Party. He was a member of the House of Representatives of the Netherlands from 1905 until 1925, when he became minister of Labour, Trade and Industry, which was a single ministry at the time. He was speaker of the House of Representatives of the Netherlands in the period from 14 October 1920 to 5 August 1925. After being a minister he became a member of the Council of State.

Decorations

References

External links

Official
  Mr.Dr. D.A.P.N. Koolen Parlement & Politiek

1871 births
1945 deaths
Commanders of the Order of the Netherlands Lion
Dutch academic administrators
Dutch prosecutors
Dutch Roman Catholics
Knights Grand Cross of the Order of St Gregory the Great
Members of the Council of State (Netherlands)
Members of the House of Representatives (Netherlands)
Ministers of Economic Affairs of the Netherlands
Ministers of Social Affairs of the Netherlands
People from Rijswijk
Politicians from Utrecht (city)
People from Voorschoten
Speakers of the House of Representatives (Netherlands)
Utrecht University alumni
19th-century Dutch civil servants
19th-century Dutch educators
19th-century Dutch lawyers
20th-century Dutch civil servants
20th-century Dutch educators
20th-century Dutch judges
20th-century Dutch politicians